Miikka Toivola (11 July 1949 – 26 January 2017) was a Finnish footballer.

Football career
He earned 62 caps at international level between 1967 and 1980, scoring 4 goals.

At club level Toivola played for PTU, TPS and HJK.

Honours
Finnish Championship: 1971, 1972, 1973, 1978
Finnish Footballer of the Year: 1972, 1978

References

1949 births
2017 deaths
Sportspeople from Pori
Finnish footballers
Finland international footballers
Finnish football managers
Helsingin Jalkapalloklubi players
Turun Palloseura footballers
Helsingin Jalkapalloklubi managers
Mestaruussarja players
Association football midfielders